Yakovlevka is the name of several rural localities in Russia:
Yakovlevka, Karmaskalinsky District, Republic of Bashkortostan, a village in Adzitarovsky Selsoviet of Karmaskalinsky District of the Republic of Bashkortostan
Yakovlevka, Khaybullinsky District, Republic of Bashkortostan, a selo in Tatyr-Uzyaksky Selsoviet of Khaybullinsky District of the Republic of Bashkortostan
Yakovlevka, Belgorod Oblast, a selo in Novooskolsky District of Belgorod Oblast
Yakovlevka, Kemerovo Oblast, a settlement in Polutornikovskaya Rural Territory of Tashtagolsky District of Kemerovo Oblast
Yakovlevka, Kurgan Oblast, a village in Chistovsky Selsoviet of Shchuchansky District of Kurgan Oblast
Yakovlevka, Oktyabrsky District, Kursk Oblast, a village in Artyukhovsky Selsoviet of Oktyabrsky District of Kursk Oblast
Yakovlevka, Pristensky District, Kursk Oblast, a village in Kotovsky Selsoviet of Pristensky District of Kursk Oblast
Yakovlevka, Gryazinsky District, Lipetsk Oblast, a village in Karamyshevsky Selsoviet of Gryazinsky District of Lipetsk Oblast
Yakovlevka, Lubnovsky Selsoviet, Lipetsky District, Lipetsk Oblast, a village in Lubnovsky Selsoviet of Lipetsky District of Lipetsk Oblast
Yakovlevka, Sentsovsky Selsoviet, Lipetsky District, Lipetsk Oblast, a village in Sentsovsky Selsoviet of Lipetsky District of Lipetsk Oblast
Yakovlevka, Nizhny Novgorod Oblast, a selo in Diveyevsky Selsoviet of Diveyevsky District of Nizhny Novgorod Oblast
Yakovlevka, Omsk Oblast, a village in Astyrovsky Rural Okrug of Gorkovsky District of Omsk Oblast
Yakovlevka, Abdulinsky District, Orenburg Oblast, a selo in Iskrinsky Selsoviet of Abdulinsky District of Orenburg Oblast
Yakovlevka, Asekeyevsky District, Orenburg Oblast, a selo in Yakovlevsky Selsoviet of Asekeyevsky District of Orenburg Oblast
Yakovlevka, Grachyovsky District, Orenburg Oblast, a selo in Alexandrovsky Selsoviet of Grachyovsky District of Orenburg Oblast
Yakovlevka, Saraktashsky District, Orenburg Oblast, a selo in Nadezhdinsky Selsoviet of Saraktashsky District of Orenburg Oblast
Yakovlevka, Penza Oblast, a selo in Yakovlevsky Selsoviet of Bekovsky District of Penza Oblast
Yakovlevka, Perm Krai, a village in Ordinsky District of Perm Krai
Yakovlevka, Primorsky Krai, a selo in Yakovlevsky District of Primorsky Krai
Yakovlevka, Saratov Oblast, a selo in Bazarno-Karabulaksky District of Saratov Oblast
Yakovlevka, Tambov Oblast, a village in Karpelsky Selsoviet of Mordovsky District of Tambov Oblast
Yakovlevka, Vologda Oblast, a village in Pertsevsky Selsoviet of Gryazovetsky District of Vologda Oblast